Hitler's Children is a 1943 American black-and-white propaganda film made by RKO Radio Pictures. The film stars Tim Holt, Bonita Granville and Kent Smith and was directed by Edward Dmytryk from an adaptation by Emmet Lavery of Gregor Ziemer's book Education for Death.

The film was among the most financially successful produced by RKO Studios. It is known for its portrayal of brutality associated with the Hitler Youth, represented particularly by two young participants.

Plot
In 1933 Berlin, Professor Nichols runs the American Colony School. It is next to the Horst Wessel School, where young Germans are indoctrinated into Nazism. During a brawl between the student bodies, Karl Bruner, a German youth born in the United States, objects when Anna Muller, an American citizen born in Germany, smacks him with her hockey stick. However, the two are attracted to each other. The professor, Anna, and Karl become good friends, though they do not agree politically. After a while, they lose touch with each other.

Six years later, as war looms in Europe, Karl Bruner, now a lieutenant in the Gestapo, removes students of foreign nationalities from the American school. Muller is also removed even though she is working there as an assistant teacher. Because she was born in Germany to German parents, the German government classifies her as German despite her American citizenship.

Nichols tries to find Muller, but the American consulate has no power and Muller's German grandparents are too frightened to help. Nichols' friend Franz Erhart, a formerly bold journalist who now fears being reported by his own children, suggests that the professor seek permission from the Ministry of Education to inspect a labor camp where Muller is likely being held. Nichols meets Gestapo Colonel Henkel and his aide and protégé Bruner. Henkel approves Nichols' request to visit Muller but, in private, Bruner tries to dissuade Nichols, insisting that Muller has now been converted to Nazi ideology. Bruner is disbelieving, but when he meets Muller at the camp she acts as if she is a true believer. After Nichols leaves, Bruner tells Muller that he has recommended her for an advanced geopolitik course at a German university. Muller reveals that she hates the system and has gone along with it because she has no choice.

When Muller is interviewed by Henkel and Dr. Graf of the education department, she furiously declines the opportunity, making her true feelings clear. She is sent back to the camp and demoted from the staff to a laborer position. When she persists in anti-Nazi behavior, Henkel orders that she be sterilized. When Bruner learns of this, he tries to persuade Muller to pretend to be a good Nazi and bear his child to prove her usefulness to Germany, but she refuses.

Muller flees the camp and reaches Berlin, where she hides in a church. A search party finds her and takes her away over the protests of the bishop. Henkel orders her to receive ten lashes and sends Bruner to witness her punishment. After she is whipped the second time, Bruner stops the action, although he knows that he has doomed himself and Muller.

Bruner pretends to have realized his mistake and recants. However, Henkel arranges for a national radio broadcast of the trial of Bruner and Muller and promises Karl full honors at his funeral. Professor Nichols is ordered to leave Germany immediately; if he does not, he will be arrested as an accessory to treason. At the airport, Nichols hears Karl's opening statement denouncing Hitler's Germany before the young man is shot and killed. Muller is shot and killed as she rushes to Karl.

Cast

Production
Tim Holt was offered the lead role, but when it seemed that he would be unavailable, Kent Smith was assigned. However, Holt did play the lead role and Smith moved to a supporting role.

Originally Hitler's Children was directed by Irving Reis, but he fought with producer Edward A. Golden and was replaced by Edward Dmytryk.

Reception
In a contemporary review for The New York Times, critic Bosley Crowther considered the melodrama to be "obvious, conventional" and noted: "Edward Dmytryk, who directed, has set the whole thing in an oratorical style and has given it the quality of a philippic rather than a credible story from life."

Despite lukewarm critical reviews, Hitler's Children was a great financial success, earning RKO a profit of $1.21 million.  It was the fourth-highest grossing film of the year and RKO's most successful film of the year. Dmytryk and writer Emmet Lavery were awarded $5,000 bonuses for their work.

The film's great success led RKO to hire Dmytryk to direct other war films. He directed Back to Bataan, The Young Lions and the smash hit The Caine Mutiny. The last war film that he made was Anzio (1968).

See also
 Education for Death, the Disney cartoon based on Ziemer's book
 Hitler – Dead or Alive
 The Strange Death of Adolf Hitler (film)
 The Hitler Gang

References

Bibliography

 Jewell, Richard B. Slow Fade to Black: The Decline of RKO Radio Pictures. Oakland, California: University of California Press, 2016. .
 Jewell, Richard B. and Vernon Harbin. The RKO Story. New Rochelle, New York: Arlington House, 1982. .

External links
 
 
 

1943 films
American World War II propaganda films
Anti-fascist propaganda films
American black-and-white films
Films scored by Roy Webb
Films based on non-fiction books
Films directed by Edward Dmytryk
RKO Pictures films
Sterilization in fiction
Films set in Germany
Films about Nazi Germany
American drama films
1943 drama films
1940s English-language films